Edith Elise Cadogan Cowper (21 July 185918 November 1933) was a prolific author of adventure stories for girls. She married yachtsman Frank Cowper and had eight children by him before the marriage fell apart.

Early life
Cowper was born on 21 July 1859 at Stevenage, Hertfordshire. Her parents was the Reverend Edward Cadogan (c. 183316 April 1890) and stockbroker's daughter Alice Smith (25 January 183324 March 1913). Cowper was the second of the couple's ten children. By the 1861 census her father has the Rector at Walton, Warwickshire, England, but moved to take up the Rectorship at Wickham in 1873, where he was to remain until his death in 1890.

Cowper married Frank Cooper (14 January 184928 May 1930) at her father's church in Wicken, Northamptonshire, England on 28 December 1867. She was seventeen at the time, and her husband was ten years older. He was a yachtsman, famous for single-handed cruising, and author, both of novels and of books on sailing. The couple had eight children, four boys and four girls: Frank Cadogan Cowper, Edith Alice Magdalen Cowper, Earnest Lionel Cadogen Cowper, Gerald Audrey Cadogan Cooper, Gladys Blanche Katherine Cowper, Gwenllyan Sybilla Mary Cowper, Henry Evelyn Cadogan Cowper, and Nesta Evelyn Dorothea Cowper. The first five children were registered as Cooper and had their names changed to Cowper when their father changed his name. The youngest three, being born after the name change iun 1885, were registered with the surname Cowper.

Some sources suggest that Cowper had ten children, with two of them, Lois and Edward, dying in infancy, in addition to Henry. However, there is no record of such births in the birth index of the Government Record Office, and Cowpers's own account of the number of children she has had in the 1911 census, with eight children born and six surviving, suggests that there were no such births.

The couple lived first in Hordle, Hampshire where they ran a small preparatory school. Later, they build Lisle Court at Wootton in the Isle of Wight, which also served as a school. The 1891 census shows Cowper living at Lisle Court with six of her children, Gerald, age 9 at the time is absent for some reason. The census shows that the house was no longer working as a school.

The marriage was not a happy one. The summary of Frank Cadogan Cowper's letters to his mother in the Royal Academy Collections states that Cowper divorced her on the grounds of violence and infidelity, but Sims and Clare says that while the marriage broke up, they may never have divorced.. Cowper still describes herself as married in the 1911 census.

By 1901, Cowper was living in Acton in London with her four daughters, aged 12 to 21 and with her profession listed as authoress. The 1911 census found Cowper living with her daughter Nesta at Flat 7, Fairlawn Court, Acton Lane, Chiswick, London. Her other three daughters had already married, and Nesta would do so in 1914.

Cowper was living at Milford on Sea, Hampshire when she dies on 18 November 1933. Her estate was valued at £977 6s.7d.

Writing
The Evening Post (New Zealand) says that Cowper published her first, book, set in the New Forest before she was 20. However, the first book recorded in the Jisc Library Hub Discover database Additional libraries are being added all the time, and the catalogue collates national, university, and research libraries. is Hide and Seek, published in 1881. She followed this with Hasselaers in 1883. It is note clear who published the first book, but the second was published by the Society for Promoting Christian Knowledge (SPCK). The SPCK published all but three of her books until 1915, after which she began to use other publishers. She first published with Blackie & Son in 1917, and Blackie would publish nearly half of her output from then on.

Cowper wrote adventures stories for teenage girls. Many of the feature sailing. The wilds of Canada, where one of her sons had settled before the First World War, feature in many of here stories, whether searching for gold, or trapping. Smuggling is another repeated trope, even featuring in her school story Fifth Form Adventurers.

Assessment
Cowper was writing for what Alice Corkran called the Modern Girl in her Chat with the Girl of the Period in The Girl's Realm.

Kate Flint said that while researching for the Woman Reader, she was hardly surprised to find how many girls in the nineteenth century openly preferred their brothers' books, with the active role models that they offered. Cowper offered here girl readers active role models. The Yorkshire Post when speaking of Cowper and similar girl's authors, said that Girls need no longer impound their brothers’ books for such stories fortunately they can now see themselves as the protagonists in these romances. and that Cowper can always be relied on for action.

Works
The following bibliography is based on a search on the Jisc Library Hub Discover database for books authored by Cowper. In all, there are 69 books listed in the table, as two of the items are derivatives. Cowper contributed to a number of anthologies  and annuals but these are not included here, nor in any reissues of her work. She also wrote some short fiction for magazines, but again, there are not listed here.

Notes

References

External links
 
 
 

1859 births
1933 deaths
English children's writers
Victorian women writers
20th-century English novelists
20th-century British women writers
British women children's writers
British women novelists